The  is Japan's national women's open golf championship. From 2006 (as of 2011) it is one of the two richest tournaments on the LPGA of Japan Tour, with a prize fund of 140 million Yen.

Tournament names through the years:
1968–1970: TBS Women's Open
1971–present: Japan Women's Open Golf Championship

Winners

References

External links 
 

LPGA of Japan Tour events
Golf tournaments in Japan
1968 establishments in Japan
Recurring sporting events established in 1968